The End of the Affair is a chamber opera with music by Jake Heggie and a libretto by Heggie, Heather McDonald and Leonard Foglia.

Based on the Graham Greene novel of the same title, it is set in London in 1944 and 1946 and focuses on Maurice and Sarah, who vows to end their illicit affair if his life is spared in a bombing. His survival leads to Sarah's religious conversion and Maurice's railing against God for it. After Sarah returns to her husband, Maurice hires a private detective to investigate her under direction of her husband Henry.

Performance history
It premiered in March 2004 at Houston Grand Opera. The libretto's last ten minutes were revised to alter the ending for performances at Madison Opera and Seattle Opera.

The second version of the opera was recorded live in 2007 at the Lyric Opera of Kansas City with Emily Pulley (soprano) as Sarah Miles, Keith Phares (baritone) as Maurice Bendrix, Joyce Castle (mezzo-soprano) as Mrs. Bertram, Victor Benedetti (baritone) as Henry Miles, Robert Orth (baritone) as private Mr. Parkis, and Gerard Powers (tenor) as Richard Smythe.

Critical reaction
Reaction to the version of the novel was decidedly mixed. "In what is a kind of on-stage musical equivalent of the slow fade into a flashback, he tells the story while bits and pieces are sung by the other characters until we are firmly in the flashback. That was an interesting effect that worked well," The same reviewer comments: "That is a good message but the response from most was so what. The connection between that and the love of God was not communicated."

Roles

References

External links
"Opera Review; Bombs Fall, and an Affair Is Disrupted" by John Rockwell, The New York Times, March 12, 2004
, Cheryl Barker and William Dazeley, London Philharmonic Orchestra, David Parry; Chandos Records 2009
Musical Excerpts from the Seattle production

Operas by Jake Heggie
English-language operas
Chamber operas
Operas
2004 operas
Opera world premieres at Houston Grand Opera
Operas set in London 
Operas based on novels